Michael Anthony Singletary (born September 19, 1988) is an American professional basketball player for Taipei Fubon Braves of the ABL and PLG.

References

External links

Texas Tech Red Raiders bio

1988 births
Living people
American expatriate basketball people in Belgium
American expatriate basketball people in Montenegro
American expatriate basketball people in the Philippines
American expatriate basketball people in Thailand
Barako Bull Energy players
Basketball players from El Paso, Texas
Erie BayHawks (2008–2017) players
KK Mornar Bar players
Osaka Evessa players
Philippine Basketball Association imports
Power forwards (basketball)
Rio Grande Valley Vipers players
San Miguel Beermen players
Small forwards
Texas Tech Red Raiders basketball players
RBC Pepinster players
ASEAN Basketball League players
American men's basketball players
American expatriate basketball people in Taiwan
Taipei Fubon Braves players
P. League+ imports
American expatriate basketball people in Italy